Epilepsy Currents is a bimonthly peer-reviewed open-access medical journal that was established in 2001 by the American Epilepsy Society. It publishes commentary articles, written by a board of contributing editors, and brief topical reviews. While commentary articles are solicited from members of the board of contributing editors, the editors entertain suggestions regarding topics for review articles. Content is available on the society's web site and on PubMed Central. The journal began to be self-published by the society in collaboration with Allen Press in 2011; prior to that time the journal was published on behalf of the society by Wiley-Blackwell.

Abstracting and indexing 
The journal is abstracted and indexed in Academic Search, CSA Biological Sciences Database, Neurosciences Abstracts, PubMed Central, Science Citation Index Expanded, and Current Contents/Clinical Medicine. According to the Journal Citation Reports, the journal has a 2017 impact factor of 9.333.

Editors 
The founding editors-in-chief were Susan Spencer (Yale University), Robert L. Macdonald (Vanderbilt University), Michael A. Rogawski (National Institutes of Health), and Gregory K. Bergey (Johns Hopkins University). In December 2008, Gregory K. Bergey and Michael A. Rogawski (then at UC Davis School of Medicine) were appointed editors-in-chief. The current editors-in-chief are Jack M. Parent (University of Michigan) and Andres M. Kanner (University of Miami), and associate editors are David C. Spencer ([Oregon Health Sciences University]) and Michael Wong ([Washington University]).

References

External links 
 

Publications established in 2001
Epilepsy journals
English-language journals
Bimonthly journals
Academic journals published by learned and professional societies